Susobhan Chandra Sarkar (1900–1982) was an Indian historian.

Background and education
Sarkar, son of Suresh Chandra Sarkar, was born into a Brahmo family of Dhaka. He attended Dhaka Collegiate School, studied history at Presidency College, Calcutta and continued his higher education at Jesus College, Oxford, from 1923 to 1925. His daughter Sipra Sarkar was a professor of history at Jadavpur University, Calcutta and Sumit Sarkar was professor of history at Delhi University.

Career
He returned to India as a Lecturer in History at Calcutta University before being appointed Reader in History at Dhaka University in 1927. Through the 1920s he was involved in the administration of Visva-Bharati, Santiniketan, still under the active tutelage of its founder, Rabindranath Tagore. In 1932, he was appointed Professor of History at Presidency College, Calcutta. He will be remembered as a long serving professor of the college who inspired generations of students from both science and arts streams.

He moved to Jadavpur University as Professor in 1956. He returned to Calcutta University for his final academic post from 1961 to 1967.

Sarkar, whose work was influenced by his Marxist and Gramscian ideas, taught the history of modern Europe, particularly the development of constitutional history in Britain and political thought in Western Europe. He also wrote from the 1930s about the Bengal Renaissance. His Notes on Bengal Renaissance sparked an interest in nationalist Indian historiography. He also wrote the manifesto of the CPI.

Legacy
The Paschimbanga Itihas Samsad, in collaboration with Presidency University, Kolkata (erstwhile Presidency College), has been organizing a lecture series in Sarkar's memory since 1994.

References

External links
 Notes on the Bengal Renaissance (1946) People's Publishing House, Bombay.

1900 births
1982 deaths
20th-century Bengalis
Bengali Hindus
Bengali-language writers
Presidency University, Kolkata alumni
University of Calcutta alumni
Alumni of Jesus College, Oxford
Bengali historians
Indian historians
Indian academics
Indian writers
Indian male writers
Indian lecturers
20th-century Indian writers
20th-century Indian male writers
20th-century Indian historians
Brahmos
Academic staff of Presidency University, Kolkata
Academic staff of the University of Calcutta
Historians of India
Indian Marxist historians
Indian political writers
People associated with Santiniketan
People from West Bengal
Scholars from West Bengal
People from Dhaka